Nikolay Sergeyevich Yevseyev (born 16 April 1966) is a Russian former freestyle swimmer. He won a silver and a bronze medal in 4 × 100 m relays at the 1986 World Aquatics Championships. Two years later he competed at the 1988 Summer Olympics in three relays and won a silver and a bronze medal. In the 4 × 100 m medley relay he swam only in the preliminary round, whereas his team was disqualified in the 4 × 200 m freestyle relay.

He graduated from the Lesgaft University of Physical Education in Saint Petersburg, where he was coached by Gennadi Touretski. In 1994 he moved to Germany where he works as a swimming coach. He married Angela Maurer, a German Olympic marathon swimmer and his trainee. They have a son, Maxim, born ca. 2005.

References

1966 births
Living people
Russian male swimmers
Russian male freestyle swimmers
Olympic swimmers of the Soviet Union
Swimmers at the 1988 Summer Olympics
Olympic silver medalists for the Soviet Union
Olympic bronze medalists in swimming
World Aquatics Championships medalists in swimming
Medalists at the 1988 Summer Olympics
Olympic bronze medalists for the Soviet Union
Olympic silver medalists in swimming
Soviet male swimmers